Tebiauea is a settlement in Kiribati.  It is located on Maiana Atoll; the nearest location, about six nautical miles north, is Tebikerai.
There are 147 residents of the village (2010 census).

References

Populated places in Kiribati